Christian Labit (born 11 February 1971) is a French rugby player. He played for both RC Narbonne and Stade Toulousain and then moved to English club Northampton Saints. He was a member of France's 2003 Rugby World Cup squad. Whilst at Toulouse he won the Heineken Cup in 2003 and 2005.

Clubs
As player:
 Lézignan Sangliers
 RC Narbonne : 1989–1997
 Stade Toulousain : 1997–2005
 RC Narbonne : 2005 – February 2007
 Northampton Saints February 2007 – May 2007
As coach:
 US Carcassonne : June 2007 – November 2013

References

External links
 RWC 2003 bio
 ERC rugby bio

1971 births
French rugby union players
Living people
Rugby union number eights
Northampton Saints players
France international rugby union players